The acronym ANZAC came from the Australian and New Zealand Army Corps, formed in Egypt prior to the Gallipoli Campaign during the First World War. The corps was the higher formation for all Australian and New Zealand soldiers. It then gave its name to ANZAC Cove, on the Gallipoli peninsula, and at first was only used to identify the men who took part in the Gallipoli landings, although it later came to mean "any Australian or New Zealand soldier of the First World War." Both the 'ANZAC' and the 'Anzac' versions of the acronym have been protected by the Commonwealth Government of Australia.

The acronym was used during the war by the I ANZAC Corps and the II ANZAC Corps in Egypt and later on the Western Front. Then there was the 1st (ANZAC) Wireless Signal Squadron, which served in the Mesopotamia Campaign. The Australian and New Zealand Mounted Division formed in March 1916 also made use of the acronym. The division's name was abbreviated to the A. & N. Z. Mounted Division, to the ANZAC Mounted Division, and to the Anzac Mounted Division by the Australian official history, and the New Zealand official history.

Also serving alongside the ANZAC Mounted Division in the Egyptian Expeditionary Force was the ANZAC Provost Police Corps, the 1st (ANZAC), 3rd (ANZAC), and 4th (ANZAC) Battalions, Imperial Camel Corps Brigade.

The acronym was not inclusive. One formation that had troops assigned from both Australia and New Zealand, during the war, and did not use it was the 5th Light Horse Brigade.

References
Footnotes

Citations

Bibliography
 

ANZAC